Gonzalez or González may refer to:

People
 González (surname)

Places
 González, Cesar, Colombia
 González Municipality, Tamaulipas, Mexico
 Gonzalez, Florida, United States
 González Island, Antarctica
 González Anchorage, Antarctica
 Juan González, Adjuntas, Puerto Rico
 Pedro González, Panama

Other
 Ernesto Gonzalez, cartoon character in Bordertown (American TV series)
 Gonzalez (band), a British band, and their 1974 album
 González Byass, a Spanish winery
 USS Gonzalez, a U.S. Navy destroyer

See also

 Gonçalves, Portuguese equivalent of Gonzalez
 Gonsales, Portuguese variation of Gonzalez
 Gonsalves, English language variation of Gonçalves
 Gonzales (disambiguation)
 Justice Gonzalez (disambiguation)